Baboucarr Gaye (born 24 February 1998) is a professional footballer who plays as a goalkeeper for Bulgarian First League club Lokomotiv Sofia. Born in Germany, he represents the Gambia national team.

Club career
Having spent his youth career with Arminia Bielefeld, it was announced that Gaye would leave the club on 30 June 2019, having never appeared for the first team. On 21 July 2019, he subsequently joined SG Wattenscheid 09. After just nine games, Gaye was forced to find another new club after Wattenscheid filed for bankruptcy in mid-October 2019, forfeiting the rest of their season. In January 2020, the young goalkeeper joined VfB Stuttgart II.

In July 2020, Gaye moved to TuS Rot-Weiß Koblenz. In January 2023, he signed a one-and-a-half year contract with Bulgarian club Lokomotiv Sofia.

International career
Gaye debuted with the Gambia national team in a friendly 1–0 win over Congo on 9 October 2020.

He played in the 2021 Africa cup of Nations, his national team's first continental tournament, where they made a sensational quarter-final.

Notes

References

External links
 
 
 
 
 

1998 births
Living people
German people of Gambian descent
German sportspeople of African descent
Sportspeople from Bielefeld
People with acquired Gambian citizenship
Gambian footballers
German footballers
Footballers from North Rhine-Westphalia
Association football goalkeepers
The Gambia international footballers
2021 Africa Cup of Nations players
Arminia Bielefeld players
SG Wattenscheid 09 players
VfB Stuttgart II players
FC Rot-Weiß Koblenz players
SV Rödinghausen players
Regionalliga players